The Delhi University Stadium is a Rugby sevens stadium, situated within the North Campus of Delhi University. The construction work began in 2008 and it was inaugurated in July 2010, ahead of the 2010 Commonwealth Games, and also includes training area for Netball, Boxing, Women's Wrestling and Athletics. It hosts office of Delhi University Sports Council. It also houses other institutions of Delhi University like Delhi University Community Radio, Cluster Innovation Centre, Delhi School of Journalism.

History 

After the games the stadium was handed over to the university by Commonwealth Games (CWG) Organising Committee, thereafter in 2011, the university initiated an extensive upgrade plan, to create a multi-purpose arena with both outdoor and indoor facilities, after its completion the university students could access its facilities in late 2011.
The university made an extensive upgrade plan to create a multi-purpose arena with both outdoor and indoor facilities and has training area for Netball, Boxing, Women's Wrestling and Athletics but in 2014, university decided to offer infrastructural facilities on rent to generate resources because of high maintainces.
In 2011, Cluster Innovation Centre was founded and hosted here. Since then, first, second and third floor of the building is taken up by Cluster Innovation Centre. In 2017, Delhi University started Delhi School of Journalism which takes up the ground floor and basement of the University Stadium Building.

Overview

Commonwealth Games Delhi, 2010
Inaugurated on 15 July 2010, Delhi University Stadium hosted Rugby Sevens for the 2010 Commonwealth Games. The stadium, spread over an area of 10,000 metres, also served as the training venue for netball, boxing, women's wrestling and athletics during the Games.

The stadium has features like auto-sprinkling technology, underground drainage system, ozone system for air-freshening, a low power consuming air-conditioning system and natural grass.

Transport
The Stadium is accessible via the underground Vishwavidyalay Station of the Delhi Metro railway. North campus of Delhi university lies on ring road of delhi. Regular DTC bus service is available for north campus and stadium.

References

External links 
 Delhi University Khabar
 Wikimapia

Sports venues in Delhi
Sports venues completed in 2010
Delhi University
2010 Commonwealth Games venues
Rugby union stadiums in India
University sports venues in India
2010 establishments in Delhi